Dichlororuthenium tricarbonyl dimer is an organoruthenium compound with the formula [RuCl2(CO)3]2.  A yellow solid, the molecule features a pair of octahedral Ru centers bridged by a pair of chloride ligands.  The complex is a common starting material in ruthenium chemistry.

Synthesis and reactions
Dichlororuthenium tricarbonyl dimer arises by the carbonylation of a hot solution of ruthenium trichloride in methoxyethanol.

The complex exists in equilibrium with the polymer:
n [RuCl2(CO)3]2  →  [RuCl2(CO)2]2n   +  2 CO
It reacts with potassium hydroxide in alcohol to give triruthenium dodecacarbonyl.

Dichlororuthenium tricarbonyl dimer reacts with glycine to give tricarbonylchloroglycinatoruthenium(II).

References

Carbonyl complexes
Coordination complexes
Ruthenium(II) compounds
Chloro complexes